Raheem Jefferson Brennerman (also known as Raheem Jefferson Soe-Tan Jr. Brennerman) is an oil and real estate business magnate, entrepreneur and philanthropist. He currently serves as the chairman for RJB Capital, and its core businesses, The Blacksands Pacific Group, BSP Technologies and BLV Group Corporation. He is also the Chair & Co-Trustee for Brennerman Family Foundation Trust and the principal of Brennerman Family Holdings and The House of Brennerman Holdings.

Life 

Born in 1978, Brennerman grew-up living in New York city and then in both London and Switzerland. Brennerman's father was an American businessman but he was primarily raised by his mother, an international businesswoman, a diamond broker and textile trader. His step-father, an American banker and businessman of Nigerian descent, also partly raised him and introduced him to the oil trading business on the African continent. Brennerman was admitted at the age of sixteen to one of Europe's most prestigious colleges at the University of London, where he earned his bachelor's degree with honors in Economics at the top of his class and later achieved a master's degree from Columbia University. He started his career in Investment Banking at J. P. Morgan Chase & Co with focus on mergers and acquisition in the U.S. and European markets.

In 2004 Brennerman founded BLV Group Corporation (a real estate and lifestyle company) and in April 2010 founded an oil and gas company, Blacksands Pacific Group, one of only three black owned energy business in the United States. On leaving J. P. Morgan Chase & Co and prior to establishing his businesses, Brennerman worked for the family energy business, which was started by his paternal grandfather in Louisiana. Brennerman also managed the family-owned real estate business and investments, established by his maternal grandparents.

As a young man, Brennerman briefly adopted his step-father's name for eight years and in 2002, he legally changed his name back to his birth name, Raheem Jefferson Brennerman. In 2012, the United Kingdom passport agency incorrectly issued him a renewal passport in the incorrect order of forenames, Jefferson Raheem Brennerman instead of Raheem Jefferson Brennerman.

Brennerman is an avid supporter of education, sponsoring aspiring and talented young students. He is also interested in fighting for equal protection and civil rights and liberties. Through his non-profit endeavors among other things, he has sponsored students from other parts of the world to the United States to further their education.

Companies 

In 2004, Brennerman founded BLV Group Corporation, a real estate investment, management and development company which was previously based in New York with assets in Europe, Africa and Asia. The company focuses primarily on luxury condominiums, ultra luxury lifestyle hotels and spas and digital real estate. Under the essenza style brand, it provides lifestyle services from bespoke interior design to dedicated concierge services and more.

In 2010, Brennerman founded Blacksands Pacific, an international oil and gas exploration and production company which was previously headquartered in Los Angeles and with assets in North America and Africa. Originally an energy trading company marketing crude oil and petroleum products. The company expanded to focus on exploration and production. Blacksands Pacific now also transports, stores, purchases and markets crude oil, natural gas, natural gas liquids, and bitumen. Currently operating in nine countries, Blacksands Pacific has announced that it is investing significantly in E&P and midstream oil and gas projects in Nigeria and Cote D' Ivoire and has entered into joint ventures in mining and infrastructure projects, including distributing gas between African countries. In an interview with LEADERS magazine in October 2014, Brennerman revealed that Blacksands Pacific had experienced significant growth especially in exploration and production, but that it is divesting its smaller interest assets in order to focus on larger assets that the company was acquiring, such as assets in the Gulf of Mexico that are expanding to produce over 100,000 barrels by 2019.

In 2016, Blacksands Pacific where Brennerman remains chairman and Co-CEO merged with BLV Group Corporation and later became The Blacksands Pacific Industries, an industrial and lifestyle corporation with operations and capital deployment in energy (including Oil & Gas, Gas & Power, Midstream, Trading & Marketing ("MTM") and Renewable); real estate and lifestyle (with focus on transformational mixed-use projects consisting of uber luxury condominiums, luxury hotels, spas and pioneering retail assets with broader focus on digital assets); Technologies and Natural Resources and Infrastructure. The Blacksands Pacific Industries, is the parent company to Blacksands Pacific Energy Limited; BLV Real Estate & Lifestyle Limited; BSP Technologies Limited; and BSP Natural Resources & Infrastructure Limited.

As part of a complete reorganization, the trustees of The Brennerman Family Trust and The House of Brennerman Trust formed RJB Capital to focus on advisory, private equity & venture capital, private debt and hedge fund and to take advantage of the energy transition and emerging opportunities in the technology sector on the African continent. As part of its business strategy RJB Capital acquired The Blacksands Pacific Group, BSP Technologies and BLV Group Corporation as its core businesses. Brennerman was appointed as chairman and Chief strategist for RJB Capital and its core businesses.

Advocacy 

Brennerman has been a vocal advocate of the US oil and gas industries' investments in Africa, claiming that US expertise and technology is helping to build long-term capacity in Africa to the benefit of local businesses and communities.  He has pressed the US Government to spend more on shale oil and gas infrastructure in order to create more jobs and ultimately raise tax revenues, lower manufacturing costs and generate less reliance on energy imports.  Brennerman has also called for the US Government to lift the export ban on crude oil to help stimulate investment, create jobs and stabilize global energy markets.  Other issues that Brennerman has written about in the media include the importance of the Gulf of Mexico as a continuing source of hydrocarbons and the need for oil and gas producers in the GCC countries to increase their investment in shale oil and gas exploration and technology.

Legal 

In 2013, a Chinese bank, Industrial and Commercial Bank of China - ICBC, agreed to $1.35 Billion oil and gas financing with Blacksands Pacific. When ICBC reneged on the agreement after Blacksands Pacific had spent in-excess of $11 million to satisfy the financing conditions, ICBC agreed to provide Blacksands Pacific with a $20 million bridge loan finance with the agreement to roll it into a $70 million revolver credit facility. Blacksands Pacific withdrew $5 million from the $20 million to cover the expenses it had already incurred. ICBC ultimately reneged again on rolling the bridge finance into a revolver credit facility. Blacksands Pacific refused to repay the $5 million arguing that ICBC caused it to incur expenses, when it had no intention of complying with the agreement. ICBC sued Blacksands Pacific in New York State Supreme Court.  Blacksands Pacific attorneys subsequently moved the case to U.S. District Court for the Southern District of New York and the case was assigned to Judge Lewis A. Kaplan.

Although the civil case had been ongoing since 2014, in 2016 Judge Kaplan ignored the federal rule against conducting extrajudicial research into Brennerman by Googling him. Judge Kaplan also ignored the law which states that a party not involved with the civil case cannot be held in contempt and he illegally pierced through the corporate veil of Blacksands Pacific and held Brennerman, the chairman and CEO, in contempt even though Brennerman was not involved in the civil case between ICBC and Blacksands Pacific.  Judge Kaplan never directed him personally to do anything; there was no motion to compel or subpoena issued for him to do anything.

Following the erroneously adjudged contempt against Brennerman, on April 19, 2017, at the insistence and behest of Judge Kaplan, the prosecutors from the United States Attorney Office for the Southern District of New York flew from New York to Las Vegas to arrest Brennerman for criminal contempt of court, based on an arrest warrant which was prepared, signed and enforced at the insistence of Judge Kaplan, even though there was no pending charge(s) against Brennerman. Brennerman was granted bail by Chief Judge Colleen McMahon of the Southern District of New York. Thereafter, on May 31, 2017, the same prosecutors indicted Brennerman without any prior investigation on fraud charges based on the same civil case between ICBC and Blacksands Pacific, which had been ongoing for a few years. The case was assigned to Judge Richard J. Sullivan. The prosecutors indicted Brennerman without ever obtaining or reviewing the pertinent transaction files from ICBC. The next day, on June 1, 2017, the federal prosecutors disseminated online under the headline "Chairman and CEO of purported Oil and Gas Company charged in Manhattan Federal Court with $300 million International Fraud Scheme".

Prior to trial, Brennerman, through his attorneys at Thompson Hine LLP, repeatedly requested for the pertinent ICBC transaction files to show that he is innocent of the charges. However, both Judge Kaplan and Judge Sullivan separately denied his request and refused to provide him the evidence. During trial, when the prosecution witness Julian Madgett from ICBC testified that the evidence exists with the bank in their London office, which documents the basis for the bank approving the transaction and thus will clearly show whether Brennerman made a misrepresentation to commit fraud or not. This evidence was important since the prosecutors never requested, obtained or reviewed it prior to indicting Brennerman for fraud. However, when Brennerman again made request to Judge Sullivan for the evidence to use for his defense and to confront the witness against him, Judge Sullivan denied his request while stating on the record that Julian Madgett had testified that the evidence (ICBC files) are with the bank's file in London, United Kingdom. This was despite the fact that ICBC had already provided over 6,000 pages of email communication between ICBC and Blacksands Pacific from London, United Kingdom while omitting the most important documents - the transaction underwriting files which would have conclusively demonstrated whether any fraud occurred.

According to court filings, to distract from the fact that there was/is no evidence to support the fraud allegations and in an endeavor to promote false narrative, both Judge Sullivan and the federal prosecutors pivoted to disseminate falsehoods and promote xenophobia and stereotype. Even though the federal prosecutors were in possession of Brennerman's birth certificate, passports and Government issued identification documents from United Kingdom, United States, and Switzerland, they disseminated that Brennerman would abscond to Nigeria, a country where Brennerman is neither a citizen or resident. This was disseminated to promote xenophobia and stereotype about Nigeria given their fraud allegations. During trial, the federal prosecutors intentionally withheld Brennerman's birth certificate from the jury. The evidence would have clearly refuted the false stereotype and proven Brennerman's name and nationality.

The falsehood, xenophobia and stereotype was also promoted after trial on December 10, 2017, when the Sunday Times of London disseminated online two contemporaneous articles with one headlined "Fraudster, Raheem Brennerman faces 90 years in jail".

In May 2018, following investigation into the criminal cases, Forbes released a publication headlined "Businessman convicted in two criminal cases has new legal representation: himself", where Forbes highlighted the issues with the two criminal cases, first that Brennerman was prosecuted and convicted for criminal contempt of court for court orders that were never directed at him but at Blacksands Pacific, the company. That Judge Kaplan insisted on the prosecutors arresting Brennerman, even while the prosecutors pleaded with the judge against such arrest. The Forbes article highlighted that the bank fraud focused on the wealth management account which Brennerman opened in January 2013 in Beverly Hills, California at Morgan Stanley Smith Barney, LLC - which is not a bank and not FDIC insured. Further that the bank fraud charge and conviction was not about $300 million of financing but that Brennerman received $6,500 in banking perks. The article further highlighted that the fraud case focused on the $5 million bridge finance provided to Blacksands Pacific by ICBC following negotiations for a $600 million - $750 million credit line. It highlighted that the $5 million bridge finance was to reimburse Blacksands Pacific, given that the company had extended more than twice that amount in satisfying the finance conditions of ICBC and that Brennerman was, as of May 2018, after the trial, attempting to obtain the complete records including the lending and underwriting files from ICBC which were never presented at trial and which would have demonstrated his innocence.

In November 2018, Forbes released a further publication headlined "Businessman Raheem Brennerman denied evidence to prove innocence, vows to fight on", where Forbes highlighted that the sentence imposed by Judge Sullivan on November 19, 2018, was harsh considering that Brennerman's conviction was for $5 million bridge finance transaction and that there was no evidence of $300 million international fraud throughout his trial. Also that Brennerman had been denied evidence at trial which he required to defend himself and confront witness against him. The publication also highlighted that Brennerman was sentenced on civil contempt charges involving the transaction between ICBC and Blacksands Pacific, a case in which Brennerman was not even personally involved.

In June 2020, the United States Court of Appeals for the Second Circuit rejected Brennerman's challenge to his convictions. On November 23, 2020, and again on December 29, 2020, Brennerman filed further papers with the United States Court of Appeals for the Second Circuit addressed to Chief Judge Debra Ann Livingston challenging his conviction and highlighting with demonstrable evidence that the Second Circuit Appeals Court panel misrepresented material facts, evidence and record as to the fraud conviction and created disparity with the Court's prior instructions as to the contempt convictions.

In February 2021, further demonstrable evidence was presented to the Court highlighting that Judge Richard J. Sullivan fabricated and distorted evidence to convict and sentence Brennerman for bank fraud, while also intentionally depriving Brennerman access to evidence which would demonstrate his innocence of the other fraud charges. The court filings highlight that the entire prosecution was fabricated by Judge Kaplan, Judge Sullivan and the federal prosecutors. When they lacked evidence, Judge Sullivan fabricated and distorted it. Judge Kaplan ignored the law to convict Brennerman and the federal prosecutors were pressured by the judges to falsely prosecute Brennerman. They intentionally disseminated falsehoods about Brennerman's name, nationality and educational background in an endeavor to cause reputational damage and distract from the racial injustice with the wrongful prosecution and false imprisonment.

In a 350-page filing on Tuesday July 27, 2021 at the United States Court of Appeals for the Second Circuit, docket no. 20-4164(L), doc. no. 62, Brennerman, 43, alleges he has been falsely imprisoned in a conspiracy between two senior federal judges and prosecutors. Following his allegation, prosecutors aggressively and vindictively sought retribution and retaliated by filing motion for asset forfeiture nearly 3 years after sentencing which the judge immediately approved without giving Brennerman his right to respond.

The motion, requesting to release Brennerman from incarceration has been filed with the Manhattan federal appeals court. To-date the U.S. federal prosecutors and respective judges have failed to provide any arguments to refute the allegations highlighted by Brennerman.

On August 10, 2021, Brennerman also made submission to the Chief Judge of the Manhattan federal court in respect of the criminal cases, 17 Cr. 155 (LAK) and 17 Cr. 337 (RJS) highlighting the judicial misconduct and bias and prosecutorial misconduct, seeking dismissal of the judgment of conviction and sentence or in the alternative that new judges be assigned to consider the issues.

On August 17, 2021, Chief Judge of Manhattan federal court, Laura Taylor Swain, wrote that her court had no jurisdiction over the cases and directed Brennerman back to the courts of Judges Kaplan and Sullivan 

In November 2021, the Second Circuit U.S. Court of Appeals responded to Brennerman's July 27, 2021 filing, that it had no jurisdiction to decide the case and closed the matter, so Brennerman could return to the district courts of Judges Kaplan and Sullivan

Collateral Attack Filings 

On November 16, 2021, Brennerman filed a 442-page Collateral Attack Petition to Judge Sullivan seeking dismissal of the fraud convictions and sentence including bank fraud and conspiracy to bank fraud. Brennerman detailed how Judge Sullivan fabricated evidence and asked Judge Sullivan to recuse himself from the case. After more than 8 months neither the prosecutors nor Judge Sullivan have responded to Brennerman's Petition. An exchange of letters occurred in July 2022 (see section 4.2 Reporting Crimes and Misconduct)

On January 31, 2022, Brennerman filed a 189-page Collateral Attack Petition to Judge Kaplan seeking dismissal of the contempt convictions and sentence, highlighting the conspiracy to deprive him of the requested documents/evidence so as to wrongly convict and imprison him.

To date 35 separate filings on the collateral attack motion have been docketed at Brennerman v. U.S., 22 Cv. 996 (LAK), EFC Nos. 1-35. Judge Kaplan's Court issued its first denial order at EFC No. 19, then the Court reversed itself and reopened the case at EFC No. 24, then the Court issued its second denial order at EFC No. 26 and currently has issued a Memorandum Endorsement of its denial at EFC No. 34. Throughout Brennerman has docketed letters, motions and responses highlighting the Court's actions as simply an endeavor to cover-up crimes and misconduct perpetuated against Brennerman by Government prosecutors acting on its [the Court] behalf. The crime and cover-up is succinctly summarized in Brennerman's letter to Judge Kaplan, dated July 21, 2022 headed "Crimes and Misconduct against Petitioner-Defendant", that government prosecutors, acting on behalf of Judge Kaplan's court, conspired to intentionally deprive Brennerman his constitutional right to liberty by conspiring with Linklaters LLP through Attorney Paul Hessler to withhold and hide away pertinent and exculpatory evidence (the missing ICBC files) which Linklaters has confirmed remains in their possession.

Reporting Crimes and Misconduct 

On April 14, 2022, Brennerman wrote a letter to Laura Taylor Swain, Chief Judge of the U.S. District Court of the Southern District of New York to highlight the conspiracy in respect of his two criminal cases to deprive Brennerman of the requested documents/evidence so as to wrongly and falsely convict him. Brennerman wrote that Judge Richard Sullivan intentionally misrepresented (fabricated) evidence by surreptitiously supplanting Morgan Stanley Smith Barney, LLC a non-FDIC insured institution with Morgan Stanley Private Bank, a FDIC insured institution, so as to falsely satisfy the law to falsely convict and imprison Brennerman. Judge Kaplan, in an endeavor to cover-up the conspiracy, following Brenenrman's request for ICBC evidence and extension to file reply motion, abruptly denied all pending motions and ordered closure of the entire collateral attack petition without any evidentiary hearing on the critical issue of the conspiracy and ICBC file or allowing Brenenrman the opportunity to file a reply motion (to rebut the Government's response). Judge Kaplan's denial was to cover-up the conspiracy to deprive Brennerman of the ICBC evidence and testimony from Mr. Hessler to explain why he (Mr. Hessler) withheld evidence. Brennerman wrote that he hoped that a supervisory authority would intervene to protect United States' democracy that affords every person within its territory the right to liberty and from unwarranted infringement of such right through misconduct.

On May 5, 2022, Brennerman wrote again to the Hon. Laura Taylor Swain, Chief Judge of the U.S. District Court of the Southern District of New York, formally notifying her that crimes had been committed against him by District Court Judges Kaplan and Sullivan, Department of Justice federal prosecutors and the international law firm Linklaters, through Attorney Paul Hessler, to intentionally withhold production of exculpatory ICBC documents/evidence, including the underwriting file which exonerated Brennerman and which Brennerman required to prove his innocence at trial. The letter stated that should the Courts, Judge Kaplan and Judge Sullivan disagree with him, the courts were entitled to refer him for further prosecution, but that they could not and would not do so, because that action would entitle Brennerman to discovery, that he would be able to request and obtain the missing ICBC documents and evidence, and Brennerman would be able to expose the conspiracy through depositions of Paul Hessler and other partners at Linklaters.

On May 17, 2022, The Hon. Laura Taylor Swain wrote in response that her Court did not exert any authority over the cases and to file a misconduct complaint to the Clerk of the Second Circuit U.S. Court of Appeals.

On May 18, 2022, Brennerman wrote to Judge Sullivan to formally notify, appraise and inform Judge Sullivan's court that crimes and civil rights violations had been committed against him through the U.S. District Court for the Southern District of New York, Brennerman presented the same content as in his earlier May 5, 2022 letter to Hon. Laura Taylor Swain, Chief Judge.

On May 22, 2022, Brennerman wrote to Judge Kaplan responding to Judge Kaplan's denial of his Collateral Attack Petition but also notifying the Court of crimes/misconduct perpetuated against him by federal prosecutors and judges through the U.S. District Court for the Southern District of New York. The letter stated that Judge Kaplan had endeavored to obfuscate and cover-up the crime of conspiracy with the government prosecutors, acting on behalf of Judge Kaplan, conspiring with Linklaters LLP (attorney for alleged victim) through Attorney Paul Hessler, to intentionally withhold production of pertinent and exculpatory evidence, ICBC files, which demonstrates Brennerman's innocence.

On July 7, 2022, Brennerman sent a letter to Judge Kaplan to request expedited relief from crimes and misconduct against him, Brennerman wrote that he was deprived of the above to even exercise his Constitutional rights to present his complete defense to the jury at trial, hence why Government prosecutors, acting on behalf of the Court, conspired with Linklaters LLP to intentionally hide away the evidence which Brennerman required in demonstrating his innocence of the charged crime.

On July 18, 2022, Judge Kaplan issued a "Memorandum Endorsement" to deny Brennerman's request for relief on the basis that the Collateral Attack Petition had been closed, that "the Court is not obliged to respond to defendant's commentaries on its ruling and declines to do so" and that any appeal would not be taken in good faith 

Brennerman's letter to Judge Kaplan on July 21, 2022, stated that federal courts have a solemn obligation to protect the Constitutional rights of a criminal defendant, however that Government prosecutors, acting on behalf of the Court, conspired to intentionally deprive Brennerman, a criminal defendant, of his Constitutional rights to liberty by conspiring with Linklaters LLP, through Attorney Paul Hessler to intentionally hide away pertinent and exculpatory evidence, missing ICBC files, which Linklaters LLP New York office confirmed remains in their possession. The letter goes on to state that this situation is an egregious situation where a federal court (Judge Lewis Kaplan), intentionally encourages crimes and misconduct against Brennerman, a criminal defendant, on its behalf.

On July 19, 2022, Judge Sullivan issued an order that he would not be docketing Brennerman's May 18, 2022 letter, that Brennerman had made "inflammatory" comments. On July 21, 2022, Brennerman responded to Judge Sullivan and Ruby Krajick (Clerk of Court) that he was perplexed by the Court's order because the Clerk of Court is obliged by law and the federal rules to file his letter prior to the Court rendering its judgment or comments. Brennerman wrote that impartial judges are tasked to rule based on requested relief which are filed on the record and publicly docketed rather than decide which controversy in a criminal proceeding will be publicly docketed and which will not

Activism  
At the end of June 2020, Mr. Brennerman and other activist volunteers launched the campaign "FREE RAHEEM BRENNERMAN" and the website at www.freeraheem.org, which allege systemic oppression and racial injustice, and asserts that his was a wrongful prosecution that led to false imprisonment.  The campaign highlights that Manhattan Federal Court blatantly ignored the law, the record and evidence, and also highlights Judge Kaplan and Judge Sullivan's alleged errors, bias and violation of Brennerman's Constitutional rights, among others. The campaign is reaching out to politicians, celebrities, influencers and advocates to stand with the campaign against racial injustice and in support of Raheem Brennerman and anyone else who has been affected by the alleged systemic oppression and racial injustice.

On September 20, 2020, a formal COMPLAINT in furtherance of the complaint filed on behalf of Mr. Steven Donziger against SDNY District Court Judge Lewis A. Kaplan and extended to Second Circuit Court Judge Richard J. Sullivan was submitted to the Chief Judge of the Second Circuit of the United States Court of Appeals to highlight the pattern of Judicial Misconduct, Abuse of Power and Racial Injustice with the wrongful prosecution and false imprisonment of Raheem Jefferson Brennerman.  More details about Steven Donziger's own experience with Judge Kaplan's abuse of power have been provided here.

References

External links
Interview in The New York Times, August 8, 2008
Letter to Financial Times, August 13, 2014
Guest contributor to Oil and Gas Investor, September 4, 2014
Letter to The Hill, September 23, 2014
Interview in LEADERS magazine, October, 2014
Guest contributor to Oil and Gas Investor, November 7, 2014
Businessman convicted in two criminal cases has new legal representation, himself, May 29, 2018
Businessman Raheem Brennerman Denied Evidence To Prove Innocence, Vows To Fight On, November 30, 2018
Free Raheem J Brennerman Campaign

Living people
Year of birth missing (living people)